Loubressac is a commune in the Lot department in south-western France.

The 1973 movie Quelques messieurs trop tranquilles, directed by Georges Lautner, is set in Loubressac.

Loubressac is the location of the Roman Catholic church Église Saint-Jean-Baptiste or St. John the Baptist Church.

See also
Communes of the Lot department

References

Communes of Lot (department)
Plus Beaux Villages de France